Wallerstedt is a surname. Notable people with the surname include:

Jonas Wallerstedt (born 1978), Swedish soccer player and coach
Sara Grace Wallerstedt (born 1999), American fashion model
Brett Wallerstedt (born 1970), American football player

Swedish-language surnames